Velvel Pasternak (October 1, 1933 – June 11, 2019) was a musicologist, conductor, arranger, producer, and publisher specializing in Jewish music. In 1981, the New York Times described him as "an expert on the music of the Hasidic sect and probably the largest publisher of Jewish music anywhere, although he was quick to note that publishing Jewish music is a business that attracts few rivals."

Biography 
Velvel Pasternak was born in Toronto in 1933 to immigrant parents from Poland. He received an Orthodox Jewish education and was a graduate of Yeshiva University High School for Boys (class of 1951) and of Yeshiva University (class of 1955). He also studied at  the Juilliard School, and received a master's in music education from Teachers College, Columbia University.

The founder of Tara Publications, he was responsible for the publication of 26 recordings and over 150 books of Jewish music since 1971, spanning the gamut of Israeli, Yiddish, Ladino, cantorial, Hasidic and Holocaust music. He was a regular lecturer on the music of the Hassidim. He died on June 11, 2019, in New York City.

Published works  
 Songs of the Chassidim (1970)
 Songs of the Chassidim II (1971)
 The Best of Israeli Folk Dances (1997) (previous edition 1990)
 The Jewish Fake Book (1997)
 Z'Mirot and Kumzitz Songbook (1997)
 Beyond Hava Nagila (1999)
 The Jewish Music Companion  (2003)
 Songs Never Silenced--The Folk Music And Poetry of the Shoah (2003) (with Shmerke Kaczerginsky)
 The Best of Hasidic Song: Selections from 7 Acclaimed Music Books  (2012)
 The Big Jewish Songbook (2014)
 Shlomo Carlebach Anthology: Compiled, Edited and Arranged by Velvel Pasternak (2016)
 Behind the Music, Stories, Anecdotes, Articles and Reflections (2017)

See also
Jewish music

References

External links
Tara Publications 
  
 

1933 births
2019 deaths
Jewish musicologists
Jewish composers
Sheet music publishers (people)
American Orthodox Jews
Hasidic music
Canadian emigrants to the United States
American people of Polish-Jewish descent